Derwent Living is an independent, not-for-profit provider of affordable and specialist housing in the Midlands, Yorkshire and the South East of England.  As well as homes to rent for people on lower incomes, Derwent Living offers properties for retired people, homes for sale through part-buy, part-rent schemes, residential lettings and key-worker accommodation.  Derwent Living is the trading name of Derwent Housing Association Limited, based at Pride Park in Derby, United Kingdom. Derwent Living relocated from two different sites on Phoenix Street and Stuart Street, Derby to its current headquarters in December 2003.

Activities 

Derwent Living provide affordable housing for those in greatest need. In order to fund these schemes, Derwent Living uses its profits from its commercial student accommodation activities to develop its social housing projects.

These projects include homes to rent for people on lower incomes; young professionals looking for their first property; homes to rent and buy for people aged 55 or over (usually grouped together in order to create retirement communities); accommodation for NHS staff; and special need schemes for frail elderly people including Asian elders.

Derwent Living is governed by a board of management. The board comprises members with relevant knowledge and skills, all of whom have an interest in housing and in particular the provision of housing for those in need. Derwent Living conducts its business through its board which is legally responsible for the affairs of the company.

They incorporate the views of its residents through consultation, participation and annual customer satisfaction surveys.   In 2009 the Audit Commission offered a mixed rating – “Derwent Living responds well to the needs of individual customers, but there are some basic gaps in how its service is managed” – but has since received several awards for customer service.

Derwent Living is one of the largest housing associations in the Midlands, responsible for around 15,000 properties and has continued to build homes despite the recent economic downturn.  The estate agent Savills put Derwent Living in a list of the top 11 providers of purpose built student housing, of which only three were housing associations.

Subsidiaries and commercial operations

Derwent Facilities Management
Derwent Facilities Management Limited (Derwent fm) is a subsidiary of Derwent Living. They are based at Hornbeam Business Park, Hookstone Road in Harrogate. 
Derwent fm offers integrated and bundled services or individual services (such as cleaning, security, maintenance etc.) to suit the needs of clients.

Derwent fm operates across a wide spectrum of clients including student accommodation, central and local government, private sector and health and education.

Uliving 
Uliving was Established in 2009 and is a joint venture between Bouygues Development and Derwent Living. Bouygues Development is the UK property arm of international services group Bouygues.

History 
Derwent Living was founded in 1964 to provide co-ownership housing for first time buyers. During its first 10 years, homes were provided in Derby, Nottingham, Loughborough and the West Midlands. In the mid-to-late 1970s, a Housing Association Grant allowed it to build much of its housing stock.  As grants decreased during the 1980s, the company switched its development focus from houses to flats for single people, couples and sheltered schemes for the elderly.

During the 1990s, Derwent Living moved into providing student accommodation and offering maintenance and housing management services to other landlords. The 2000s saw a substantial increase in the amount of student accommodation offered, as well as Keyworker accommodation for NHS staff.

As house prices in England rose to outstrip salaries, demand for part-buy part-rent options increased. As the house market began to decline they introduced a ‘Try before you buy’ scheme - renting a property for up to three years at a reduced costs whilst saving for the deposit to buy the property. This was picked up by the Homes and Communities Agency, who promoted the scheme nationally as ‘Rent to Homebuy’.

The Butterfly Project 
In 2009, Derwent Living was awarded first place in the Complex Needs category at the Guardian Public Services Awards for 'The Butterfly Project'. The project provides a refuge for women who are victims of domestic violence and who also suffer from mental health problems or drug and alcohol addiction. The project was set up in 2009 and has its roots in the women's refuge at Derby which Derwent Living has managed for over 15 years.

Swap Tears for Smiles
The housing association have also started a charity which aims to improve the lives of women and children staying at the hostel in Derby by providing trips out, Christmas gifts and other morale-boosting events.	.

See also 
 Housing association

References 

Housing associations based in England
Organisations based in Derby